The multi-leaded power package is a style of electronic component package, commonly used for high power integrated circuits, especially for monolithic audio amplifiers. It was derived from single in-line package. The difference is the lead arrangement; multi-leaded power packages usually have the lead bent to zig-zag pattern. Multi-leaded power packages commonly have more than three leads; nine-, thirteen- and fifteen-lead units are common, units with five or seven leads with TO-220 style are also manufactured.  A notable characteristic is a metal tab with a hole, used in mounting the case to a heatsink. The physical view of multi-leaded power packages are simply stretched TO-220 packages. Components made in multi-leaded power packages can handle more power than those constructed in TO-220 cases, or even TO3 cases with thermal resistance no less than 1.5 C/W.

One well-known STMicroelectronics brand of this type of package is Multiwatt.

Typical applications
Multi-leaded power packages are heatsinkable, and thus can be used in projects where a large amount of power is being drawn.  The top of the package has a metal tab with a hole used in mounting the component to a heatsink.  Thermal compound is also used to provide greater heat transfer.

The metal tab is often connected electrically to the internal circuitry, ground and supply connection are common.  This does not normally pose a problem when using isolated heatsinks, but an electrically-insulating pad or sheet may be required to electrically isolate the component from the heatsink if the heatsink is grounded or otherwise non-isolated.  The material used to electrically isolate the multi-leaded power package, like mica, needs to have a high thermal conductivity.

In applications where vertical clearance is at a premium (such as ISA cards in computers), it is often feasible to bend the leads at a right angle and mount the component flat to the printed wiring board using a screw and nut.  This often provides enough surface area to heatsink the component when power dissipation is moderately high.

References

Chip carriers